Thomas Best may refer to:

Politicians
Thomas Best (MP for Canterbury) (c. 1713–1795), MP for Canterbury
Thomas Best (MP for Lewes) (fl. 1446/7), MP for Lewes
Thomas Best (MP for Ripon) (1589–c. 1649), MP for Ripon

Others
Thomas Best (navy captain) (1570?–1638?), English naval captain
Thomas Best (basketball), played in 1980–81 NCAA Division I men's basketball season
Thomas Best (writer), author of 1787 English book A Concise Treatise on the Art of Angling
Tommy Best (1920–2018), Welsh footballer

See also
Thomas Best Woodward (born 1814), Protestant Chaplain in the County Gaol, Downpatrick and Dean of Down